The 1993-94 Luxembourg Championship season was the first season of Luxembourg's hockey league. Tornado Luxembourg won the league title by defeating IHC Beaufort in the final.

Final
(2 games total goals)
Tornado Luxembourg - IHC Beaufort 30-5

External links
Season on hockeyarchives.info

Luxembourg Championship
Luxembourg Championship (ice hockey) seasons